Megachile filicornis is a species of bee in the family Megachilidae. It was described by Friese in 1908.

References

Filicornis
Insects described in 1908